WOCB-CD, virtual channel 39 (UHF digital channel 22), is a low-powered, Class A TCT-affiliated television station licensed Marion, Ohio, United States. WXCB-CD (UHF digital channel 25; also mapped to virtual channel 39 via PSIP) in Delaware. WGCT-CD (VHF digital channel 8; also mapped to virtual channel 39 via PSIP) in Columbus.

COACB TV39 Founded August 24, 1987, the station is owned by the Central Ohio Association of Christian Broadcasters

The station's web site claims that there is an additional WOCB-CD transmitter on channel 34 in Kenton; the FCC shows Kenton was originally granted a limited license.  However, it seems their special temporary authority has been renewed every six months since the license was issued.

***WOCB, WXCB, WGCT, and WQIZ (COACB TV39) Is on Spectrum Cable System In Marion only.  Some have said Spectrum Cable System will not add them to the following areas: Columbus, Ohio and Mansfield, Ohio due to them being low powdered.***

Digital channels
The stations' digital signals are multiplexed:

External links
The Central Ohio Association Of Christian Broadcasters (COACB) site
TCT site
Buzzr site
Daystar site

OCB-CD
Low-power television stations in the United States
Buzzr affiliates